The North Galapagos Microplate is a small tectonic plate off the west coast of South America north of the Galapagos Islands.  It is rotating counterclockwise between three much larger crustal plates around it, the Nazca, Cocos and Pacific Plates.  To its south, another small microplate, the Galapagos Microplate is likewise rotating, but clockwise.  Both microplates "mesh" along the interface between them.

References

Bird, P. (2003) An updated digital model of plate boundaries, Geochemistry, Geophysics, Geosystems, 4(3), 1027, . 

Tectonic plates
Geology of the Pacific Ocean